Eastview High School is a comprehensive and college preparatory public high school in Apple Valley, Minnesota, United States. Established in 1997, Eastview is the newest of the four high schools serving Independent School District 196. Newsweek ranked the school in their "List of the Top High Schools in America" for the sixth consecutive time (2000, 2002, 2004, and 2006, 2007, 2008). Eastview has also been recognized by U.S. News & World Report as one of America's Best High Schools. In 2013, Eastview was ranked in the top 3% of the most challenging high schools in the United States, as well as a top comprehensive high school in Minnesota.  Prior to the 2010–2011 school year, Eastview was a member of the Lake Conference, but then broke off with most of the Lake Conference schools in order to create the South Suburban Conference.

Feeder schools

Students matriculate from three different public middle schools:
Falcon Ridge Middle school (located in Apple Valley, MN)
Scott Highlands Middle School (located in Apple Valley, MN)
Black Hawk Middle School (located in Eagan, MN)

History
Eastview High School, District 196's fourth comprehensive high school, opened on September 2, 1997. Located in Apple Valley, MN, includes a 330,000 square foot facility and 200 acres of recreational facilities. It is home to over 2,000 students in grades 9–12. Eastview uses the quarter system - 10 weeks per quarter. There are four quarters in a full school year. The majority of the courses at Eastview High School are quarter courses. Some courses (School of Environmental Studies at the Minnesota Zoo courses and Career Development courses) will be 12 weeks in length because students from all district high schools will be attending these courses.

Location and facilities

The  facility is built to house 2,000 students in grades 9–12. Eastview High School's students have achieved high honors in academics, athletics, and the arts. Eastview was identified as a ten star school (highest rating) by the Minnesota Department of Education.

Athletics
Eastview's team name is the Lightning and their mascot is Zapp, an anthropomorphic lightning bolt. In only 13 years of existence, Eastview athletic teams have won 21 state championships, 47 section championships, 44 conference championships, 11 state academic championships, and 30 section academic championships. Students from Eastview join forces with other district schools to form the Dakota Hawks, an adaptive athletic team. The Hawks have won 16 state championships since Eastview joined the team when the school opened in 1997.

Notable alumni

 Devin Kelley, class of 2004. Actress on The Chicago Code and in the movie Chernobyl Diaries.
 Rhys Lloyd, class of 2001. Former NFL kicker.
 Erin Maye Quade, class of 2004. Former member of the Minnesota House of Representatives

References

External links
Official website of Eastview High School

Public high schools in Minnesota
Educational institutions established in 1997
Schools in Dakota County, Minnesota
1997 establishments in Minnesota